Neel Bhattacharya (born 8 June 1990) is an Indian Bengali television actor. He started his career in television as a lead actor through Thik Jeno Love Story and is well known for portraying the character of Nikhil in Krishnakoli.

Career
Beside working in TV soap operas, Neel has also acted in few Bengali movies notably like in Chitra and Lokkhyo. He has also performed as the lead male actor in many music videos like Chaina (Don't want), composed and sung by Shaan, Yeh Dil Hai Bekarar by Benny Dayal.

Television

Filmography

Television movies

Awards

References

External links 
 

Bengali male television actors
Bengali actors
21st-century Indian actors
Living people
1990 births
St. Xavier's College, Kolkata alumni